The Anchor Brewhouse was a small brewery by Shad Thames in Horsleydown, near Tower Bridge in London. The brewhouse was bought in December 1787 by John Courage. In 1955, the Courage Brewery merged with the nearby Anchor Brewery, then owned by Barclay, Perkins & Co Ltd, to become Courage, Barclay & Co Ltd.

The Anchor Brewhouse's building still stands, although all brewing ceased in 1981: Boilerhouse, Brewhouse and Malt Mill still show the different functions in the process of beer making. The building is an expression of historical continuity, for brewing on the river has always been an important features of London's Thames-side. Brewing in Southwark is mentioned by Chaucer, and in Horselydown by Shakespeare.

The building was restored and reconstructed in 1985-1989 and converted into luxury residential flats. It is situated in the Tower Bridge Conservation Area in Butler's Wharf.
The Anchor Tap pub that was the brewery tap is still open nearby. The pub is run by Samuel Smith.

Awards 
 Europa Nostra Diploma of Merit 1989 
 Civic Trust Award 1991

Gallery

External links

Defunct breweries of the United Kingdom
Buildings and structures in the London Borough of Southwark
Breweries in London